Augusto Marques Rodrigues Amaro (born 5 February 1911, date of death unknown) was a Portuguese footballer who played as a goalkeeper.

External links 
 
 

1911 births
Year of death missing
Portuguese footballers
Association football goalkeepers
Primeira Liga players
S.L. Benfica footballers
Portugal international footballers